The Bridge Curse is a 2020 Taiwanese horror mystery thriller film directed by , starring Summer Meng,  and . It is based on the legend of the haunted bridge at Tunghai University.

The film received a video game adaptation, which was released on Steam on 25 August 2022. The film will receive a sequel, titled The Bridge Curse: Ritual.

Cast
 Summer Meng as the Reporter
  as Chuan
  as Hsin-chiao
  as Sannu

Reception
Han Cheung of the Taipei Times wrote that while the film "has the right elements, ideas and technical capabilities", and the final twist "definitely will get people talking", it "needs better structuring" and "could be much scarier".

Douglas Tseng of today rated the film 3 stars out of 5 and wrote that "a late-game revelation helps make this otherwise routine shriek-fest slightly more interesting than it deserves to be."

Brian Costello of Common Sense Media rated the film 2 stars out of 5 and called it "unoriginal".

References

External links
 
 

Taiwanese horror thriller films
Taiwanese mystery films
2022 horror thriller films
2020s mystery thriller films